The Roland TR-606 Drumatix is a drum machine built by the Roland Corporation from 1981 to 1984. It was originally designed to be used with the Roland TB-303, a monophonic analog bass synthesizer, to provide a simple drum and bass accompaniment to guitarists without backing bands.

History
The TB-303 and TR-606 launched in 1981 as a matched pair to provide solo artists the chance to practice without other individuals, solely using the TR-606 and TB-303 as drums and bass lines to practice to, but the programming and artificial sounds made the boxes uncomfortable to use and they soon lost their luster. The group was doomed to an early demise as popular music soon shifted to sampled drum sounds and real bass lines for hit songs, as sample capabilities were the newest development of the late 1980s. At one time, the TR-606 could be found in pawn shops for as little as US$50; since the resurgence in popularity of analog drum sounds for electronic music, however, the TR-606 will commonly sell for US$400 to US$500.

While it did not sell well at first, it did eventually become an integral part of the early acid house electronic music scene and is still used by many electronic musicians.

Popular users
The TR-606 was used by punk rock/noise rock band Big Black and was credited on their records as "Roland". Steve Albini later reflected on the TR-606: "When I first got the 606 I carried it around and listened to it like a Walkman, and over the course of a day I would gradually build and re-build a rhythm until it was satisfying to listen to on its own... Drum machines can be cool instruments with a lot of character. I was always disappointed when I heard one being used clumsily, which was most of the time."

The Sisters of Mercy also used it, on their early records, where it was credited as a band member named "Doktor Avalanche." Orchestral Manoeuvres in the Dark had it listed in the liner notes of their album Dazzle Ships. Nine Inch Nails used it in their hit single "Closer" from the album "The Downward Spiral" and Dave Rowntree of the Britpop band Blur uses one on the track "On Your Own" from their 1997 self-titled album Blur.

Outside of rock music, the TR-606 was commonly used by electronica artists C. Balardo, Uwe Schmidt, Plastikman, Aphex Twin, Mike Ink, and Autechre. Even artists that preferred breakbeats to four-on-the-floor rhythms used it, seen when 4Hero credited the TR-606 on its well-received album Parallel Universe. Another example was Massive Attack's 1994 album Protection, which prominently used the machine on some tracks, and the CD booklet included a photo of the TR-606 connected to a TB-303. The Swedish electronic band Covenant has used it, citing it as "one of the most beautifully distortable drum machines ever made".

The electronic musician Kid606 mentioned the TR-606 as an inspiration in interviews and confirmed it as an inspiration for his stage name.

Sounds
The TR-606 has seven synthesized sounds: Bass Drum, Snare Drum, Hi Tom, Lo Tom, Cymbal and Open/Closed Hi Hat.

An additional function labeled accent serves to modify the volume of the entire drum mix on a given beat. This allows, for example, a louder beat 4 in a simple drum pattern: boom-chik, boom CHIK. There is no "swing" parameter on the TR-606. The output is mono.

The Lo Tom and Hi Tom tracks have outputs to trigger an external sound source.

When the closed and open hihat are played together, a 3rd hihat sound emerges.

When the trigger output is in use, the corresponding internal sound still functions normally. The tom track could be employed, for example, to trigger a kick drum synth module.

Services Notes are available at the Internet Archive.

References

See also
Roland TR-808

Drum machines
TR-606
Grooveboxes
TR-606
Musical instruments invented in the 1980s
Japanese inventions